CARDVA is a Honduran football club based in the town of Coyoles Central, near Olanchito.

The team participates in the Honduran Liga Nacional de Ascenso.

References 

Football clubs in Honduras
Association football clubs established in 2015